is a 2014 Japanese suspense thriller film directed by Sakichi Satō and starring Sayaka Akimoto and Kanata Hongō, based on the manga Doreiku by Shinichi Okada. It was released on 28 June 2014.

Cast
Sayaka Akimoto
Kanata Hongō
Hikaru Ōsawa
Yūki Yamada
Sayuri Anzu
Ayumi Orii
Takahiro Kuroishi
Yuki Kubota
Kanta Ogata
Miyuki Torii

Reception
The film has grossed NT$940,000 in Taipei, Taiwan.

References

External links
 

2010s thriller films
Japanese thriller films
2010s Japanese films